Jachai Dacuan Polite (born March 30, 1998) is an American football outside linebacker who is currently a free agent. He played college football at Florida. Polite has also been a member of the New York Jets, Seattle Seahawks, Los Angeles Rams, Toronto Argonauts and Edmonton Elks.

Early years
Polite attended Mainland High School in Daytona Beach, Florida. He recorded four sacks his senior season and 13 his junior year. He committed to the University of Florida to play college football.

College career
As a freshman at Florida in 2016, Polite played in 12 games and had 11 tackles and two sacks. As a sophomore in 2017, he played in seven games with four starts before suffering a season ending shoulder injury. He finished the year with 22 tackles and two sacks. He returned to Florida in 2018.  On December 31, 2018, Polite announced that he would declare for the 2019 NFL Draft.

College statistics

Professional career

New York Jets
Polite was selected by the New York Jets in the third round of the 2019 NFL Draft, with the 68th overall pick. In May 2019, he signed a four-year contract worth $3.64 million, with a $1.12 million signing bonus. On August 31, 2019, Polite was waived by the Jets.

Seattle Seahawks
On September 2, 2019, Polite was signed to the Seattle Seahawks practice squad. He was released on September 23, 2019.

Los Angeles Rams
On September 25, 2019, Polite was signed to the Los Angeles Rams practice squad. He signed a reserve/future contract with the Rams on December 31, 2019. In Week 5 of the 2020 season against the Washington Football Team, Polite recorded his first career sack on Alex Smith during the 30–10 win. Polite was waived by the Rams on December 3, 2020, and re-signed to the practice squad two days later. He was placed on the practice squad/COVID-19 list by the team on December 12, 2020, and restored to the practice squad on December 22. He was released from the practice squad on January 12, 2021.

Toronto Argonauts 
On March 1, 2022 Polite signed with the Toronto Argonauts of the Canadian Football League (CFL). He was released on August 3. Polite played in three games for the Argos, contributing with one defensive tackle, and one special teams tackle.

Edmonton Elks
On August 10, 2022, the Edmonton Elks announced the signing of Polite to the practice roster. He was released by the Elks less than one month later on September 7, 2022.

References

External links
Jachai Polite at Sports-Reference.com
Los Angeles Rams bio
Florida Gators bio
CFL.ca bio

1998 births
Living people
Sportspeople from Daytona Beach, Florida
Players of American football from Florida
American football defensive ends
Florida Gators football players
New York Jets players
Seattle Seahawks players
Los Angeles Rams players